Volchy is a rural locality (a khutor) in Veydelevsky District, Belgorod Oblast, Russia. The population was 171 as of 2010. There is 1 street.

Geography 
Volchy is located 23 km south of Veydelevka (the district's administrative centre) by road. Solontsy is the nearest rural locality.

References 

Rural localities in Veydelevsky District